Beriu is a commune in Hunedoara County, Transylvania, Romania. It is composed of eight villages: Beriu, Căstău (Kasztó), Cucuiș (Kukuis), Măgureni (Magureny), Orăștioara de Jos (Alsóvárosvíz), Poieni (Pojénytanya), Sereca (Szereka) and Sibișel (Ósebeshely).

References

Communes in Hunedoara County
Localities in Transylvania